Holy Trinity Cathedral  is the cathedral church of Tirunelveli Diocese under Church of South India.

Bishops of the CSI Tirunelveli Diocese 
 Samuel Morley   	1896–1903
 Arthur A Williams   	1905–1914
 Harry M Waller   	1915–1923
 Norman H Tubbs  	1923–1928
 Frederick J Western  	1929–1938
 Stephen C Neill  	1939–1944 (Founder of Bishopric – CSI Tirunelveli Diocese)
 George T Selwyn  	1945–1952
 Augustine G Jebaraj  	1953–1970 (First Indian bishop – CSI Tirunelveli Diocese)
 Thomas S Garrett  	1971–1974
 S Daniel Abraham   	1975–1984
 Jason S Dharmaraj   	1985–1999
 Jeyapaul David   	1999–2009
 JJ Christhudoss   	2009–2021
 ARGST Barnabas     2021 - till the date

Images

See also
Church of South India
Tirunelveli Diocese of the Church of South India

Notes

R Joseph served as the senior pastor of Holy Trinity cathedral from 1987 to 1992.

External links

CSI Tirunelveli Diocese

Tirunelveli
Churches completed in 1826
Churches in Tirunelveli district
19th-century Anglican church buildings
1826 establishments in India
Church of South India cathedrals